The S3V Zagon is a guided but un-propelled depth charge developed by the Russian firm Tactical Missiles Corporation. It was first unveiled at the 1992 MAKS Airshow as part of a marketing effort which resulted in China purchasing the weapon.

Description
The S3V is an aerially deployed weapon, with a parachute system detached at the moment of splashdown. The sonar mounted in the nose is activated upon entering the water, searching for hostile submarines. It directs its control surfaces to maneuver the depth charge toward the target once it is located and identified. The developer has claimed that the S3V is around 1.2 to 1.6 times more effective than conventional unguided depth charges in shallow water (≤ 200 meters) and around 4 to 8 times more effective in deep water (up to 600 meters). The weapon is usually deployed by Tu-142, Il-38 and Ka-27 aircraft.

Specifications:
Length: 1.3 meters
Diameter: 211 mm
Weight: 94 kg
Warhead: 19 kg
Minimum depth required: 150 meters
Maximum operational depth: > 600 meters
Rate of descent: 16.2 meters per second
Angle of attack/descent: 60 to 90 degrees
Worst conditions allowed for aerial deployment: sea state 6
Sonar lock-on radius: 120 meters
Deployment platform: Fixed and rotary-wing aircraft

On 13 February 2017, the Zagon-2 version entered production for the Russian Ministry of Defence.

Specifications:
Length: 1.5 meters
Diameter: 232 mm
Weight: 120 kg
Warhead: 35 kg
Maximum operational depth: > 600 meters
Sonar lock-on radius: 450 meters
Deployment platform: Fixed and rotary-wing aircraft

Operators
  People's Liberation Army Navy
  Russian Navy

References

  S3V Zagon-1

Torpedoes of China
Torpedoes of Russia
Weapons of the People's Republic of China
Anti-submarine missiles